Marcos Pinheiro Pizzelli (born 3 October 1984), commonly known as Marcos, is a former professional footballer. Born in Brazil, Marcos represented Armenia internationally between 2008 and 2019.

Club career

Ararat Yerevan
Pizzelli started his career at the Brazilian club São Carlos as a youth from 2000 to 2005. In 2006, the young talent was spotted by an agent from Ararat Yerevan, who soon recruited Pizzelli. His debut took place on 30 April in a game against Ulisses. Pizzelli entered the field in the 58th minute of the match, replacing Tigran Yesayan. His first goal for Ararat happened on 16 June in another game against Ulisses. For the first season Pizzelli focused on adapting, and the next on scoring goals. With his good performances, Pizzelli was the leading scorer in the Armenian Premier League twice with Ararat, scoring 22 goals during the 2007 Armenian Premier League and scoring 17 goals during that 2008 Armenian Premier League. As a result of the financial problems that befell Ararat, the club decided to loan Pizzelli to the amateur club of the French 5th Division – Ararat (Issy-les-Moulineaux).

Pyunik Yerevan
Six months later, in the summer of 2009, Pizzelli's contract with Ararat ended, and, as a free agent, he accepted offer of FC Yerevan Pyunik. In July, he signed a long-term contract. With Pizzelli playing for Pyunik, the club won the 2009 Armenian Premier League and 2010 Armenian Premier League, won the 2009 Armenian Cup and 2010 Armenian Cup and won the 2010 Armenian Supercup. In the 10th round of the 2010 Armenian Premier League, Marcos had his 100th match in the Premier League in the history of his performance. That season, Pizzelli became the top goalscorer for a third time along with Armenian Gevorg Ghazaryan, with both scoring 16 goals. In the middle of the 2011 Armenian Premier League, Pizzelli scored six goals, but was then transferred to Metalurh Donetsk.

Metalurh Donetsk
In June 2011, Pizzelli signed a contract with Metalurh Donetsk, along with Pyunik teammate Gevorg Ghazaryan. In his first official match for the Donetsk club, Pizzelli scored a goal, and this goal, scored against Chornomorets Odesa, was the only one in the match. In the higher level championship, Pizzelli had more difficulty playing and found it harder to score than in the Armenian Premier League. However, his trouble scoring was also due to the Metalurh coach not playing as a striker, but instead as an attacking midfielder.

Kuban Krasnodar
In January 2012, Pizzelli joined Kuban Krasnodar. In 2011, in a match between Russia and Armenia, the head coach of Team Kuban Dan Petrescu spotted Pizzelli and was interested in the player. After a long observation of the game of Pizzelli, Petrescu agreed to acquire the player. On 13 January, they signed a contract for three years. On 18 March, Pizzelli scored the first goal in the Russian Premier League and brought Kuban the win over Rubin Kazan. Pizzelli was voted player of the month for Kuban a second time in May 2012.

Krasnodar
In May 2013, Pizzelli agreed to join Kuban Krasnodar's rivals FC Krasnodar on a two-year contract starting on 10 June 2013. After six months with Krasnodar, Pizzelli joined Kazakhstan Premier League side Aktobe on a season-long loan in January 2014.

Aktobe
In October 2014, Pizzelli made his loan move from FC Krasnodar permanent. Following the conclusion of the 2015 season, Pizzelli was transfer listed by Aktobe.

Al-Raed
On 18 January 2016, Pizzelli moved to Saudi club Al-Raed.

Al-Fujairah
On 27 June 2016, Pizzelli was transferred to Al-Fujairah of the UAE Arabian Gulf League.

Aktobe return 
On 13 February 2018, FC Aktobe announced the return of Pizzelli to the team. He was awarded the Kazakh Premier League top goal scorer after scoring 18 goals in 24 games.

Ararat-Armenia 
On 31 December 2019, FC Ararat-Armenia announced the signing of Pizzelli, however on 11 January, Ararat-Armenia and Pizzelli announced that he was retiring from football due to injury.

International career
In May 2008, Pizzelli received Armenian citizenship and became a member of the Armenia national team. He made his first appearance on 28 May 2008 and scored on his debut in a friendly away game against Moldova. The match ended with the score 2–2. After playing three games that year, he was briefly no longer invited to the national team. After moving to Yerevan to play for Pyunik, he again came to the attention of coaches and 12 August 2009 Marcos again played for the Armenia national team regularly. On 8 October 2010, in a match against Slovakia, he made a scoring pass to Yura Movsisyan, and a few days later, he scored Armenia's fourth goal in a game against Andorra. That victory then went on to secure Armenia's by that time highest ever FIFA World Ranking as 42nd. For his second goal for the national squad, Pizzelli scored in an away match with Russia (3–1 loss). His third goal for the team scored in am away match against Andorra in which Armenia won 3–0. His fourth goal for the national team scored in the match against Macedonia, in which Armenia won 4–1. In a friendly game, which was held 29 February 2012 against Canada, marked the first time in his double gate rivals. On 11 September 2012, Pizzelli was controversially sent off in a 2014 World Cup qualifier against Bulgaria.

On 11 October 2014, Pizzelli had a penalty saved by Serbia goalkeeper Vladimir Stojković in a UEFA Euro 2016 qualifying match, after which Zoran Tošić scored a late equaliser to give Serbia a 1–1 draw.

Personal life
Pizzelli is married to his wife Natalia. They met in Brazil and she moved with him to Armenia. He and Natalia do not have children. Pizzelli speaks Portuguese, Armenian, English and was learning Russian. He identifies as Brazilian-Armenian. Pizzelli says he feels more Armenian than Brazilian. He said he would never forget about Armenia, which gave him an opportunity to develop his skills. "I am grateful to this country for everything. I would play for Armenia as long as the squad needs me."

Career statistics

Club

International

Scores and results list Armenia's goal tally first, score column indicates score after each Pizzelli goal.

Honours
Ararat Yerevan
Armenian Cup: 2008

Pyunik Yerevan
Armenian Premier League: 2009, 2010
Armenian Cup: 2009, 2010

Aktobe
Kazakhstan Super Cup: 2014

Individual
Armenian Premier League top scorer: 2007 (22), 2008 (17), 2010 (16)
Armenian Footballer of the Year: 2018

References

External links
Profile at FFA website

Profile at armfootball.tripod.com

1984 births
Living people
People from Piracicaba
Association football forwards
Brazilian emigrants to Armenia
Brazilian footballers
Armenian footballers
Armenian expatriate footballers
Armenia international footballers
FC Ararat Yerevan players
ASA Issy players
FC Pyunik players
FC Metalurh Donetsk players
FC Kuban Krasnodar players
FC Krasnodar players
FC Aktobe players
Al-Raed FC players
Fujairah FC players
Al-Shabab FC (Riyadh) players
Expatriate footballers in France
Expatriate footballers in Ukraine
Armenian expatriate sportspeople in Ukraine
Expatriate footballers in Saudi Arabia
Expatriate footballers in the United Arab Emirates
Expatriate footballers in Russia
Expatriate footballers in Kazakhstan
Ukrainian Premier League players
Armenian Premier League players
Russian Premier League players
Kazakhstan Premier League players
Naturalized citizens of Armenia
Armenian people of Brazilian descent
Saudi Professional League players
UAE First Division League players
Footballers from São Paulo (state)